Ralph Hopton, 1st Baron Hopton,  (159628 September 1652), was an English politician, soldier and landowner. During the 1642 to 1646 First English Civil War, he served as Royalist commander in the West Country, and was made Baron Hopton of Stratton in 1643.

Along with his close friend Sir Edward Hyde (later the Earl of Clarendon), he was made advisor to the future Charles II, when he was appointed to rule the West in early 1644. He commanded the last significant Royalist field army, and followed Charles into exile after surrendering in March 1646. A devout supporter of the Church of England, his personal opposition to Catholicism and Presbyterianism meant he took no further part in the 1638 to 1651 Wars of the Three Kingdoms. He died in Bruges in 1652.

In his stated account of the war, Clarendon described him as 'a man of great honour, integrity, and piety, of great courage and industry, and an excellent officer for any command but the supreme, to which he was not equal'.

Life
Ralph Hopton was born in early 1596, and baptised on 13 March at St Peter's, in Evercreech. He was the eldest child of Robert Hopton, 1575 to 1638, and Jane ( Kemeys, circa 1570 to 1610, who owned estates in Monmouthshire. His grandfather's lands in Suffolk had been sold to provide dowries for his ten surviving daughters, and Robert inherited Witham Friary in Somerset, acquired from Glastonbury Abbey after the Dissolution of the Monasteries in 1538.   

He was educated at a local grammar school, possibly King's School, Bruton; various sources confirm he attended Lincoln College, Oxford, as did his uncle, Sir Arthur Hopton. In 1614, he studied law at Middle Temple in London, thus completing the education common for a man of his standing at the time.

He married Elizabeth Capel (1596-1646) in 1623; their marriage was childless. His estates were inherited by his nephew Thomas Wyndham, son of his eldest sister Catherine.

Career

1615 to 1642

From 1615 to 1618, Hopton was travelling in Europe, in order to 'learn languages'. In 1620, he joined an English volunteer force under Sir Horace Vere, sent to support Frederick of the Palatinate, newly appointed Protestant king of Bohemia. This was authorised by James I, whose daughter, Elizabeth, was Frederick's wife; Hopton's younger sister Abigail was one of her Maids of Honour.

After Frederick's defeat at White Mountain in November 1620, he and his close friend William Waller were among those who escorted the Royal couple to safety, the Queen reportedly riding on his horse. They finally reached safety in the Dutch Republic in early 1621.

Hopton returned to London in February, and elected Member of Parliament, or MP, for Shaftesbury, a constituency controlled by the Earl of Pembroke, a connection of his mother, Jane. Parliament's fury at James' lack of support for his sister, and the Protestant cause in general, found an outlet in charges against an elderly Catholic lawyer, Edward Floyd, accused of insulting Frederick. Despite his personal anti-Catholicism, Hopton argued Floyd should not be condemned without a proper hearing; he was ultimately released, after James intervened.

When Parliament adjourned in June, he enlisted in Sir Charles Rich's Regiment of Foot, serving in the Palatinate campaign against the Catholic League. It appears likely he was among the English garrison of Frankenthal, which was ordered by James to surrender in March 1623.

Back in England, he married Elizabeth Capell, five years his senior, and widow of Justinian Lewin, a Privy Councillor; while childless, their marriage was apparently happy. Invited to stand as MP for Somerset in 1624, he declined, instead joining an English force recruited by Mansfeld to relieve Breda, then besieged by the Spanish. They arrived in the Dutch Republic in February 1625, reportedly in an 'appalling state;' the expedition collapsed, Breda surrendered, and Hopton returned home in July.

In his absence, Hopton was appointed MP for Bath in place of Nicholas Hyde, who switched to Bristol; Hyde was the uncle of Edward Hyde, future Earl of Clarendon. Their connection links Hopton with the constitutional monarchists, those who opposed attempts by Charles I to rule without Parliament, but ultimately supported him in 1642.

During the 1625 to 1630 Anglo-Spanish War, Hopton refused to take part in the Cádiz expedition, accurately predicting its failure due to lack of funding. He was made a Knight of the Bath in February 1626, and MP for Wells in 1628. The following year, Charles dissolved Parliament, and did not recall it until 1640.

Appointed Deputy lieutenant of Somerset, and a Justice of the Peace, Hopton inherited his father's estates in 1638. He avoided involvement in the political debates of the 1630s, but supported the levying of Ship money, and in 1639, raised a troop of cavalry to fight in the first of the 1639 and 1640 Bishops Wars. Charles refused to seek financing from Parliament, and the result was chaos; although he assembled 15,000 men at York, the vast majority were untrained, unfed, unpaid and mutinous conscripts from the Northern trained bands, armed with bows and arrows. He was obliged to agree the Treaty of Berwick, leaving the Covenanters in control of Scotland.

Seeking funds for another attempt, in early 1640 Charles called what became known as the Short Parliament; Hopton was selected for Somerset, but the house refused to provide taxes without concessions, and was dissolved after three weeks. Hopton took no part in the 1640 war, another humiliating defeat; he was MP for Wells in the Long Parliament, this time called to raise the money to pay the Scots to return large parts of Northern England.

Along with Edward Hyde and other moderates, he voted for the execution of Charles' chief advisor, the Earl of Strafford; unlike them, he also backed the strongly anti-Catholic Grand Remonstrance in late 1641. A committed supporter of the Church of England, the arrest of Archbishop Laud and exclusion of bishops from the Lords seems to have been the point when he changed sides. He defended the attempt to arrest the Five Members in January 1642, and in early March, was held in the Tower of London for two weeks for objecting to Parliament censuring the king.

1642 to 1646
 
After his release in March, Hopton was appointed Royalist Commissioner of Array for Somerset, placing him in command of the local trained bands. Despite Hopton's connections, the county was dominated by Parliament, forcing him to withdraw to Sherborne, in Dorset; the First English Civil War began on 22 August, when Charles raised his standard at Nottingham.

Charles named the Marquess of Hertford as his Lieutenant General in the West. Threatened by a larger Parliamentary army under the Earl of Bedford, the Royalists retreated from Wells to Minehead, where Hopton advised Hertford to take the infantry and artillery across the water to South Wales.

Accompanied by a small force of cavalry, Hopton joined Sir Bevil Grenville and other supporters in Cornwall. Under his command, the Royalists won victories at Braddock Down in January 1643, then Stratton in May. After the inconclusive Battle of Lansdowne on 5 July, he linked up with Hertford and Prince Maurice; their combined force destroyed William Waller's Western Association army at Roundway Down on 13 July. The biggest Royalist success of the war, it secured the West Country, apart from isolated garrisons in Plymouth and elsewhere.

Temporarily blinded by an explosion after Lansdowne, Hopton was confirmed as Royalist commander in the West, made Baron Hopton of Stratton, and governor of Bristol. In September, it was agreed Prince Rupert would move against London, while Hopton advanced into Hampshire and Sussex, whose iron foundries were Parliament's main source of armaments. However, Rupert was checked at Newbury on 20 September, and although Hopton reached Winchester in November, he was prevented from moving further.  

In March 1644, he was defeated at Cheriton, ending the Royalist campaign in Southern England, and damaging his position with Charles. Although he served in the Lostwithiel campaign, his main role became one of administration; in early 1645, he was appointed to the Council advising the future Charles II. After Naseby in June, the Western Army was the last significant Royalist field force, but was scattered by the New Model Army at Langport in July.      

Hopton succeeded Lord Goring as commander in January 1646, but the remnants of his army were defeated at Torrington on 16 February 1646. He pulled back to Truro, where he surrendered to Thomas Fairfax on 12 March.

1646 to 1652

Along with Edward Hyde, he followed the Prince of Wales to Jersey; like the majority of his advisors, they refused to accompany him to Paris, concerned over the influence of his strongly Catholic mother, Henrietta Maria. His wife died shortly after, and in 1647, he moved to Rouen, where he stayed with his uncle, Sir Arthur Hopton, former Ambassador in Madrid.

He resumed his position as advisor to Charles II during the 1648 to 1649 Second English Civil War, which continued after the execution of Charles I in January 1649. He resigned after Charles II signed the 1650 Treaty of Breda, which agreed to impose Presbyterianism on England in return for Scottish support in restoring him to the throne. An Episcopalian Church of England was central to Hopton's political beliefs, and he refused to support it.

While in exile, he wrote Bellum civile, an account of his campaign in the West from 1642 to 1644. He died at Bruges in September 1652, and after the 1660 Restoration, his body was reburied at St Mary's, in Witham Friary in Somerset. Confiscated by Parliament in 1647, his estates were returned to his family, and inherited by his nephew Thomas Wyndham.

References

Sources

External links

  

 

1596 births
1652 deaths
Alumni of Lincoln College, Oxford
Barons in the Peerage of England
Peers of England created by Charles I
Cavaliers
Deputy Lieutenants of Somerset
Military history of Cornwall
English MPs 1621–1622
English MPs 1625
English MPs 1628–1629
English MPs 1640 (April)
Knights of the Bath
17th-century soldiers
Military personnel of the Thirty Years' War
17th-century English military personnel
Royalist military personnel of the English Civil War
Military personnel from Somerset
People from Mendip District